Julio Jiménez Muñoz (28 October 1934 – 8 June 2022) was a Spanish professional road racing cyclist.

Early life
Jiménez's father was an ambulance driver during Spain’s Civil War, and later a chauffeur for a general in the Spanish army, who gave Jiménez his first bike as a gift. As an amateur rider, he won a stage at the 1960 Volta a Catalunya, which helped him earn his first professional contract.

Career
Known as a climbing specialist, he won the King of the Mountains title six times at Grand Tours. He won five stages of the Tour de France in his career; stage 20 of the 1964 Tour de France was one of the most famous stages in TDF history due to the battle up the Puy-de-Dôme between Anquetil and Poulidor. This stage was won by Jiménez, who was able to cross the line 0:11 ahead of Spanish climber Federico Bahamontes, 0:57 ahead of Poulidor, 1:30 ahead of Vittorio Adorni and 1:39 ahead of Anquetil. Although beaten by Bahamontes in the Mountains classification at the 1964 Tour, Jiménez would win the Mountains classification at the next three Tours de France, also finishing second overall in 1967.  In 1965, he became one of (now) four riders to complete the Tour/Vuelta double by winning both Tour's mountains competition in the same year. He also wore the leaders jersey at the 1964 Vuelta; and the 1966 and 1968 Giro d'Italia. He retired after the 1969 season, returning to his home town of Avila where he opened a nightclub and restaurant. A short, steep pedestrianised street in Ávila, Cuesta de Julio Jiménez, is named in his honour.

Major results

1963
 King of the Mountains – Vuelta a España
1964 – Kas–Kaskol
 King of the Mountains – Vuelta a España
 2 stages – Vuelta a España
Tour de France
 2nd, King of the Mountains
 7th, General Classification
 2 stages
1965 – Kas–Kaskol
Tour de France
 Winner Mountains classification
 2 stages
 King of the Mountains – Vuelta a España
 1 stage – Vuelta a España
1966 – Ford–France–Hutchinson
Tour de France
 Winner Mountains classification
 1 stage
 Giro d'Italia
 2 stages
1967 – Spain
Tour de France
 Winner Mountains classification
 2nd overall
1968 – Spain
 Giro d'Italia
 2 stages
Tour de France
 3rd, King of the Mountains
 30th, General Classification

References

External links

Palmarès at velo-club.net 

1934 births
2022 deaths
Spanish male cyclists
Spanish Tour de France stage winners
Spanish Vuelta a España stage winners
Spanish Giro d'Italia stage winners
People from Ávila, Spain
Sportspeople from the Province of Ávila
Cyclists from Castile and León